St. Agnes Cathedral may refer to:

Japan
St. Agnes Cathedral (Kyoto)

the United States
St. Agnes Cathedral (Springfield, Missouri)
St. Agnes Cathedral (Rockville Centre, New York)

See also
Saint Agnes (disambiguation)
St. Agnes Church (disambiguation)